Melaleuca williamsii is a plant in the myrtle family, Myrtaceae and is endemic to an area between north-eastern New South Wales and south eastern Queensland in Australia. (Some Australian state herbaria continue use the name Callistemon pungens.) It is a distinctive shrub with stiff branches, silvery new growth, prickly leaves and spikes of purple flowers in late spring. It is classified as a vulnerable species under the Australian Government Endangered Species Protection Act.

Description

The flowers are deep red, white, or a shade of pink to purple. They are arranged in spikes on the ends of branches which continue to grow after flowering.

Taxonomy and naming
Melaleuca williamsii was first named in 2009 by Lyndley Craven in Novon when Callistemon pungens was transferred to the present genus. It had previously been known as Callistemon pungens, first formally described by Roger Spencer and Peter Lumley in 1990 in Muelleria, based on plant material collected from near Hillgrove. The specific epithet (williamsii) honours John Beaumont Williams, a botanist who was expert in the flora of the Northern Tablelands region of New South Wales.

There are three subspecies:

Callistemon pungens is regarded as a synonym of Melaleuca williamsii by the Royal Botanic Gardens, Kew.

Distribution and habitat
This melaleuca occurs in the higher altitude regions of north eastern New South Wales and south eastern Queensland. It grows in granite and trachyte rock crevices in forest and heath and on sandy or shallow rocky soil.

Conservation
Melaleuca williamsii (as Callistemon pungens) has been classified as "vulnerable" by the Scientific Committee of the NSW Government Department of Environment and Heritage and by the Australian Government Department of the Environment.

References

williamsii
Flora of Queensland
Flora of New South Wales
Myrtales of Australia
Vulnerable flora of Australia
Plants described in 1990
Taxa named by Lyndley Craven